Rajeshwar Singh is an Indian politician and a member of the 18th Legislative Assembly of Uttar Pradesh representing Sarojini Nagar constituency of Lucknow district. He is a member of the Bharatiya Janata Party. Singh is a former joint director of the Enforcement Directorate.

Personal life
Singh was born in Lucknow in the family of Ran Bahadur Singh, a deputy inspector general of police (DIG). A graduate from the Colvin Taluqdars' College in Lucknow, he completed his PhD from Uttar Pradesh Rajarshi Tandon Open University in 2011. SIngh is married to Laxmi Singh, an IPS officer, with whom he has a daughter.

Career
An officer of the Uttar Pradesh Police since the last 14 years, Singh took a voluntary retirement from the post of the Joint Director of Enforcement Directorate on 31 January 2022 to join politics.

In the 2022 Uttar Pradesh Legislative Assembly election, Singh represented Bharatiya Janata Party as a candidate from Sarojini Nagar and went on to defeat Samajwadi Party's Abhishek Mishra by a margin of 56,186 votes, succeeding own party member and incumbent Swati SIngh in the process.

Other ventures
Singh portrayed Rajeshwar Singh in the 2011 Hindi film Kya Yahi Sach Hai, which talked about corruption within the police force and the politician-police nexus.

References

1970s births
Living people
Bharatiya Janata Party politicians from Uttar Pradesh
Uttar Pradesh MLAs 2022–2027
People from Gautam Buddh Nagar district
People from Lucknow district
Year of birth missing (living people)
Indian police officers